Jens Erik Öhling (born 3 April 1962) is a retired professional Swedish ice hockey player. He played for Djurgårdens IF during most of his professional career. He made his debut in Elitserien in 1979 against Västra Frölunda. Öhling was the team captain during the 1995–96 season. After 18 seasons in Djurgården, Öhling ended his career in Södertälje SK in 1998. The number 11 has been retired in his honour by Djurgården.

Career statistics

Regular season and playoffs

International

References

External links

1962 births
Living people
Boston Bruins draft picks
Djurgårdens IF Hockey players
Ice hockey players at the 1984 Winter Olympics
Ice hockey players at the 1988 Winter Olympics
Medalists at the 1984 Winter Olympics
Olympic bronze medalists for Sweden
Olympic ice hockey players of Sweden
Olympic medalists in ice hockey
People from Nacka Municipality
Swedish ice hockey left wingers
Medalists at the 1988 Winter Olympics
Sportspeople from Stockholm County